János Czetz (June 8, 1822 – September 6, 1904) was a prominent Hungarian freedom fighter of Armenian and Hungarian-Székely origin, a military commander during the Hungarian Revolution of 1848, and the organizer of Argentina's first national military academy.

From 1870, Cztetz was one of the main organizers and first director of the National Military College, an important contributor to the military government of Sarmiento. The collaboration helped Argentina become one of the most advanced armies outside of Europe. The strict discipline installed at the College and indirectly in the Army, helped bring an end to the long period of the Argentine civil wars. He published a "Treatise on permanent and temporary fortification".

References

1822 births
1904 deaths
People from Covasna County
Argentine people of Armenian descent
Hungarian people of Armenian descent
Hungarian emigrants to Argentina
Burials at La Recoleta Cemetery
Hungarian Revolution of 1848
People of the Revolutions of 1848
Theresian Military Academy alumni